The 2022 Allsvenskan was the 98th season since its establishment in 1924 of Sweden's top-level football league, Allsvenskan. A total of 16 teams participated. Malmö FF were the defending champions after winning the title in the previous season.

The 2022 Allsvenskan season began on 2 April and ended on 6 November 2022 (not including play-off matches).

Highlights 
On 30 October 2022, BK Häcken secured their first Swedish championship title in the 29th and penultimate round by defeating IFK Göteborg, 4–0, in a Gothenburg derby at Gamla Ullevi.

Teams 

A total of sixteen teams are contesting the league, including thirteen sides from the previous season, and three promoted teams from the 2021 Superettan (IFK Värnamo, GIF Sundsvall and Helsingborg).

Stadiums and locations

Personnel and kits 
All teams are obligated to have the logo of the league sponsor Unibet as well as the Allsvenskan logo on the right sleeve of their shirt.

Note: Flags indicate national team as has been defined under FIFA eligibility rules. Players and Managers may hold more than one non-FIFA nationality.

Managerial changes

League table

Positions by round

Results by round

Results

Relegation play-offs 
The 14th-placed team of Allsvenskan will meet the third-placed team from 2022 Superettan in a two-legged tie on a home-and-away basis with the team from Allsvenskan finishing at home.

Varbergs BoIS won 4–2 on aggregate.

Season statistics

Top scorers

Top assists

Hat-tricks

Discipline

Player 
 Most yellow cards: 11
 Jon Birkfeldt (Varberg)

 Most red cards: 1
 Yasin Ayari (AIK)
 John Guidetti (AIK)
 Collins Sichenje (AIK)
 Vincent Thill (AIK)
 Peter Abrahamsson (BK Häcken)
 Kadir Hodžić (BK Häcken)
 Alexander Jeremejeff (BK Häcken)
 Nikola Đurđić (Degerfors)
 Joe Gyau (Degerfors)
 Sebastian Ohlsson (Degerfors)
 Alexander Blomqvist (GIF Sundsvall)
 Joe Corona (GIF Sundsvall)
 Wilhelm Loeper (Helsingborg)
 Marcus Berg (IFK Göteborg)
 Marco Lund (IFK Norrköping)
 Bernardo Vilar (IFK Värnamo)
 Wenderson (IFK Värnamo)
 Dennis Widgren (IK Sirius FK)
 Jonas Knudsen (Malmö FF)
 Noah Eile (Mjällby)
 Amir Al-Ammari (Mjällby)
 Tashreeq Matthews (Varberg)
 Felipe Sissé (Varberg)

Club 
 Most yellow cards: 89
 Varberg

 Most red cards: 4
 AIK

Awards

Annual awards

See also 

Competitions
 2022 Superettan
 2022 Division 1
 2021–22 Svenska Cupen
 2022–23 Svenska Cupen

Team seasons
 2022 Djurgårdens IF season
 2022 Hammarby Fotboll season
 2022 IFK Göteborg season
 2022 IFK Norrköping season
 2022 Malmö FF season

References

External links 
 

2022
1
Sweden
Sweden
Allsvenskan